Guided Mouse-ille (or Science on a Wet Afternoon) is a 1967 Tom and Jerry short (though the year of copyright is 1966) produced by Chuck Jones and directed by Abe Levitow, and was the second (first based on the MPAA code) space-age of the Jones era. Animation was by Don Towsley, Tom Ray, Dick Thompson, Ben Washam, Ken Harris and Philip Roman (mainly Dick and Don, with Philip and Ben), with layouts by Don Morgan and backgrounds by Thelma Witmer. The title's a pun on "Guided missile" and Séance on a Wet Afternoon.

Plot
The camera zooms right towards a Space Age facility. The year is shown to be with AD 2565.

Jerry pushes levers on his control panel and an image of a wheel of cheese materializes on the monitor. Jerry calls in robot-Jerry (which looks like a truncated yellow pencil) and gives him his mission. Robot-Jerry speeds through the hallways and ends up breaking an electric eye; this is Tom's signal for a "law-breaker" invasion. Lights and sound activate, but Tom is still sleeping. An alarm clock pops out and rings; this wakes the cat up. Tom sees robot-Jerry and calls in Mechano, a blue, jet-powered, Tom-like machine. Tom gives the robotic feline his mission and it speeds off.

Jerry sees the robot-cat on the monitor and frantically messes with the control panel. Robot-Jerry stops, sniffs, and turns around in a sequence before Mechano can eat him. Both of them speed through the hall. Mechano attempts to eat robot-Jerry a second time, but the robot-Jerry levitates himself into the air. Mechano extends his legs up and tries again, but then the robot-Jerry drops himself. Mechano crouches to avoid a large fixture, and then extends himself high to avoid a second one. Mechano lowers himself a tiny bit and grins, but soon runs into an overhang. Robot-Jerry speeds through while Mechano is left fuming. Robot-Jerry speeds past and this reactivates Mechano, who chases robot-Jerry for a third time. Jerry pulls a lever and robot-Jerry starts moving at superspeed, leaving Mechano astonished. Tom applies the same feature for Mechano. Tom sees robot-Jerry approaching his monitor and coming out of the bottom of his computer, and looks at the disappearing machine. He turns his eyes back to the monitor to see Mechano crashing through the screen and causing destruction in the room. A dazed Tom whacks the still-active head of Mechano to knock him out unconscious.

Tom has repaired his computer and the monitor shows Jerry victorious, having secured his cheese. Tom suddenly gets an idea and steps into a cylinder-like room, an invisibility chamber. He presses a button which renders him invisible. Tom walks towards Jerry's hole with a space weapon and knocks on the wall. Jerry, however, darts out in a space vehicle and squirts the cat with ink, turning Tom red, leaving him visible and vulnerable to attack again. Tom tries to shoot the mouse as revenge, but Jerry shoots the cat first and then renders him invisible again. Paramedics immediately come out and load the invisible Tom onto a stretcher.

Tom then directs Mechano wielding a gun to take care of the mouse. He knocks on the mouse hole and Jerry pops out in his vehicle. Before Mechano can get the chance to pull the trigger, Jerry plugs the gun and it explodes, blackening his head, causing his head and rear to burst out of their sockets. Mechano cries for a moment and returns by creeping up behind Tom in anger. Tom sees only the gun in the monitor before he gets shot. Offended, he takes the weapon and tries to shoot Mechano for his insubordination. However, the shot comes out the wrong end, Tom is blasted again, and he is knocked out from the blast. Mechano then laughs himself silly at what just happened, his master's revenge unexpectedly transformed into a backfire.

Jerry is now traveling across the floor in his vehicle, his eyes on a large wheel of cheese on the counter. Tom comes from behind in a magnetic crane and attracts Jerry's vehicle up to the Magno-pad. Jerry exits his vehicle in a parachute, unplugs the crane's Magno-pad from its power source sending his own vehicle falling and then Tom comes out with a hammer, ready to squash the mouse. Jerry then plugs the Magno-pad back in and the hammerhead comes off the handle and sticks to the pad, and then he unplugs it and it falls on Tom's head. Tom brims with anger as a bump forms on his head, but then Jerry repeats this before Tom can throttle him. Jerry does it for the third time, and Tom pleads with the mouse not to follow through, but Jerry unplugs the pad anyway and Tom gets bumped again. Jerry uses his new-found attack in a sequence until Tom is seen crushed to the floor, 1/3 of Jerry's height and crying at the mouse's feet. Jerry lets the cat go, and then shrugs.

A large and complex mathematical-chemical equation stating "E... = mc² (KABOOM!)" is shown on a blackboard and Tom is seen making a large quantity of explosive potion based on it, hoping that it will annihilate Jerry once and for all once installed into the bomb. The camera cuts to Jerry, who sees Tom on his monitor and is compressing the wheel of cheese into a tiny amount of a highly volatile liquid. He fills a projectile with it, flies above Tom in a gunboat, and drops the microbomb into the potion. Tom quizzically points into the vat, and then a big explosion occurs.

When the smoke clears, they find that they have bombed themselves back to the Stone Age because of the use of the extremely explosive "E... = mc²" substance.  Tom, who is now a cavecat walks out of a cave with a club and soon sees Jerry, also a cavemouse and licking on a bone. He attempts to whack the mouse, but Jerry shows him the bone, which they share. As they both share it, Tom accidentally kisses Jerry and finds him delicious. Tom tries to eat Jerry but misses, and another chase begins, which causes the viewers to think that the chase is the last chase from the future and the first chase of the Stone Age as "THE END???" appears.

Crew
Animation: Don Towsley, Tom Ray, Dick Thompson, Ben Washam, Ken Harris & Philip Roman
Layouts: Don Morgan
Backgrounds: Thelma Witmer
Vocal Effects: Mel Blanc & June Foray
Story: John Dunn
Music: Eugene Poddany
Design Consultant: Maurice Noble
Production Supervised by Les Goldman
Produced by Chuck Jones
Directed by Abe Levitow

External links

1967 films
1967 short films
1967 animated films
Films directed by Abe Levitow
Films scored by Eugene Poddany
Tom and Jerry short films
Animated films without speech
1960s American animated films
1960s science fiction comedy films
Films set in the 26th century
Metro-Goldwyn-Mayer short films
Metro-Goldwyn-Mayer animated short films
American science fiction comedy films
American robot films
Animated films about robots
Animated films about extraterrestrial life
1967 comedy films
Films about cavemen
Animated films about cavemen
MGM Animation/Visual Arts short films
1960s English-language films